Valerie Florine Huber (born 4 January 1996) is an Austrian actress and model.

Biography

Early life and career beginnings
Valerie's childhood experiences is diverse as they moved in different places. As published in Miss Earth's website, Valerie was born in Vienna, Austria but her moved to Africa when she was 6 months old. She spent her first three years in Abidjan, Ivory Coast and four years in Kampala, Uganda, where her father worked for an international aid organization. When she turned seven years old, returned to Vienna. While in Vienna, she studied in a bilingual primary school and took part as one of the main cast in an Austrian TV series. Five years later, she and her family moved to Washington D.C., where she attended the German International School. After four years there, she entered a dual-language Gymnasium AHS Theodor Kramer Straße in Vienna, Austria. In 2014, she began a training program in drama at the Schauspielschule Krauss, which she completed in 2017.

Her diverse experiences during her childhood days taught her a lot of lessons in life. She says, "All in all, I could not say I am a typical Austrian woman. No. I am a woman of the earth. A mixture of Austrian, African and American culture."

In the 2021 Netflix series Kitz, she played the role of Instagram model Vanessa von Höhenfeldt.

In January 2022, she became engaged to Paul Pizzera.

Pageantry

Miss Earth Austria
Valerie joined in the Miss Earth Austria for 2014. She was included in the final six contestants that would compete for the title. She was able to beat other five contestants, thus, winning the crown for 2014. She succeeded Katia Wagner.

Miss Earth 2014

By winning Miss Earth Austria, Valerie flew to the Philippines in November to compete with almost 100 other candidates to be Alyz Henrich's successor as Miss Earth.

At the conclusion of the pageant, she failed to enter the semifinal round. The Miss Earth 2014 title was won by Jamie Herrell of the Philippines.

References

External links
Valerie at Miss Earth official website
Miss Earth official website
Miss Earth Austria official website
Valerie at Casting Video

Living people
Actresses from Vienna
Miss Earth 2014 contestants
Austrian beauty pageant winners
1996 births
Austrian female models
Models from Vienna